Circus is a French band established in 2012 by Calogero, Stanislas, Philippe Uminski, Elsa Fourlon and Karen Brunon. All are already established artists.

Their debut self-titled album Circus was released on 5 November 2012. The songs, mostly about the circus are written by Jean-Jacques Goldman, Dominique A, Marc Lavoine and Marie Bastide. The pre-released single from the album is "Sur un fil" that was released on 18 June 2012, on radio and downloads. A big concert was also organized in Théâtre Marigny in Paris in 2013.

Band members
All five members contribute vocals and play at least one instrument each in the band:
Calogero – vocals, bass guitar and harmonica
Stanislas – vocals, piano and keyboard
Philippe Uminski – vocals, guitar
Elsa Fourlon – vocals and guitar
Karen Brunon – vocals and violin

Discography

Album
2012: Circus
Track list
"C'est quoi ce cirque?" (Lyrics: Marie Bastide – Jean-Jacques Goldman / Music: Calogero – Philippe Uminski) – (3:29)
"Sur un fil" (Lyrics: Jean-Jacques Goldman / Music: Calogero – Gioacchino – Stanislas) (4:13)
"Moi je joue" (Lyrics: Marc Lavoine – Philippe Uminski / Music: Calogero – Stanislas) (3:18)
"Chagrin d'ami" (Lyrics: Marc Lavoine / Music: Calogero) (3:17)
"Ce soir et demain" (Lyrics: Marc Lavoine / Music: Calogero) (4:16)
"L'Amour suicide" (Lyrics: Marc Lavoine / Music: Calogero) (3:22)
"Le Numéro" (Lyrics: Philippe Uminski / Music: Calogero – Stanislas) (3:28)
"Les Nuits romaines" (Lyrics: Dominique A / Music: Calogero – Stanislas) (5:30)
"La Prière de Rosa" (Lyrics: Marie Bastide / Music: Stanislas) (1:14)
"Je tombe" (Lyrics: Marie Bastide / Music: Calogero) (3:26)
"Stella monte" (Lyrics: Marie Bastide / Music: Gioacchino – Stanislas) (2:21)
"Souvenir" (Lyrics: Marc Lavoine / Music: Calogero – Gioacchino – Stanislas) (3:22)
"L'Origine" (Lyrics: Marc Lavoine / Music: Calogero) (3:35)

Singles

References

French musical groups